Fan Lichu (8 June 1933 – 3 May 2016) was a Chinese structural engineer, bridge specialist, and academician of the Chinese Academy of Engineering (CAE).

Biography
Fan was born in Shanghai on 8 June 1933. He obtained a bachelor's degree of bridge and tunnel engineering from Tongji University in 1955. He became a teaching assistant in Tongji University after his graduation. Working under Li Guohao, Fan's research was mainly in the field of bridge structural engineer. He provided aseismic design and analysis for bridges such as Nanpu Bridge, Yangpu Bridge, Donghai Bridge, Sutong Yangtze River Bridge, Jiangyin Yangtze River Bridge, viaduct and overpass in Shanghai.

Fan was elected as an academician of the Chinese Academy of Engineering for his achievements in the aseismic design and analysis for bridges in 2001.

Fan died on 3 May 2016 at the age of 82 in Shanghai.

References

1933 births
2016 deaths
Members of the Chinese Academy of Engineering
Engineers from Shanghai
Tongji University alumni
Academic staff of Tongji University